A petrol engine (gasoline engine in American English) is an internal combustion engine designed to run on petrol (gasoline). Petrol engines can often be adapted to also run on fuels such as liquefied petroleum gas and ethanol blends (such as E10 and E85).

Most petrol engines use spark ignition, unlike diesel engines which typically use compression ignition. Another key difference to diesel engines is that petrol engines typically have a lower compression ratio.

Design

Thermodynamic cycle 

Most petrol engines use either the four-stroke Otto cycle or the two-stroke cycle. Petrol engines have also been produced using the Miller cycle and Atkinson cycle.

Layout 
Most petrol-powered piston engines are straight engines or V engines. However, flat engines, W engines and other layouts are sometimes used. 

Wankel engines are classified by the number of rotors used.

Compression ratio

Cooling

Petrol engines are either air-cooled or water-cooled.

Ignition

Petrol engines use spark ignition. High voltage current for the spark may be provided by a magneto or an ignition coil.  In modern car engines the ignition timing is managed by an electronic Engine Control Unit.

Power output and efficiency 

The power output of small- and medium-sized petrol engines (along with equivalent engines using other fuels) is usually measured in kilowatts or horsepower.

Typically, petrol engines have a thermodynamic efficiency of about 20% (approximately half that of some diesel engines).

Applications
Applications of petrol engines include automobiles, motorcycles, aircraft, motorboats and small engines (such as lawn mowers, chainsaws and portable generators).

History

The first practical petrol engine was built in 1876 in Germany by Nicolaus August Otto, although there had been earlier attempts by Étienne Lenoir in 1860, Siegfried Marcus in 1864 and George Brayton in 1876.

See also
 Diesel engine
 Electric motor
 Hydrogen engine
 Jet engine

References

Internal combustion piston engines
Gasoline engines